The 1569 siege of Tachibana was one of many battles fought for control of the island of Kyūshū during Japan's Sengoku period.

Mōri Motonari led the assault on the Ōtomo clan's Tachibana castle, which was held by Hetsugi Akitsura. The Mōri, who were one of the few Sengoku-period clans to make effective or extensive use of artillery, used cannons to secure their victory.

References

See also
Battle of Tatarahama (1569)

Mōri clan
Tachibana
Tachibana
1569 in Japan
Conflicts in 1569